Novo Brdo, or Novobërda and Artana ( or Artanë), is a municipality located in the Pristina district of Kosovo. According to the 2011 census, it has a population of 6,729 inhabitants. The center of the municipality is the village of Bostane.

After the 2013 Brussels Agreement, the municipality became part of the Community of Serb Municipalities.

Name
In Serbian (and also English) "Novo Brdo" is used, literally meaning "New Hill". The name was derived from the medieval Serbian mining town of Novo Brdo. In Albanian, "Novobërdë" or "Artanë" is used.

History

Middle Ages

Novo Brdo is an archaeological site. Novo Brdo was mentioned with its present name in historical documents as early as 1326. Previously it was known as Novus Mons or Novamonte in Latin and as Nyeuberghe in Saxon texts. The famous scribe Vladislav the Grammarian was born here.

Ragusan documents attest to the presence of a significant number of Albanians living in Novo Brdo throughout the 14th and early 15th centuries, including members of the Catholic Albanian clergy with names such as Gjergjash and Gjinko, Gjini, son of Gjergji, the presbyter (1382); the reverend Gjergj Gega, Nikollë Tanushi, Gjergj Andrea Pellini and Nikolla Progonovic. In the book of debtors belonging to Ragusan merchant Mihail Lukarevic, who resided in Novo Brdo during the 1430s, 150 Albanian household heads were mentioned as living in Novo Brdo with their families. They worked as miners, artisans and specialists in the mines of Novo Brdo. The anthroponomy of these figures is characteristically Albanian; distinctive Albanian names such as Gjon, Gjin, Tanush, Progon, Lek, Gjergj and Bibë are mentioned. Some families had a mixed Slav-Albanian anthroponomy - that is to say, a Slavic first name and an Albanian last name, or last names with Albanian patronyms and Slavic suffixes such as Gjonoviç, Gjinoviq, Progonoviq, Bushatoviq, Dodishiq, Kondiq, Lekiq and other such names. Many Albanian Catholic priests were registered as residing in Novo Brdo, as well as in towns like Janjevo, Trepça, Prizren and others.

Novo Brdo was a metropolis during the Middle Ages, with a huge medieval fortress built on the top of an extinct volcano cone, the remains of which can be visited today, and residential sections sprawling all around. In the outer wall of the fortress a large cross is visible, built into the stones. The castle, or fortress, is thought to date back to the time of the Serbian Empire. At the first half of 15th century, Serbian Orthodox bishops of Lipjan resided in Novo Brdo. There were mines and smelting furnaces for iron, lead, gold and silver ores. Novo Brdo silver is known by its glam silver (argentum de glama, an alloy of silver with 1/6-1/3 gold). In 1450 the mines of Novo Brdo were producing about 6,000 kg of silver per year. The medieval settlement was an important producer of Serbian pottery and other goods.

Novo Brdo was the last Serbian town to remain standing during the first Ottoman invasion. In 1439 the capital of Smederevo fell and Serbia resisted until finally Novo Brdo fell in 1441. Novo Brdo was by treaty restored to the Serbs in 1443. The fortress (named in Turkish Nobırda) came under siege for forty days by the Ottomans, before capitulating and becoming occupied by the Ottomans on 1 June 1455. This event is described by Konstantin Mihailović from Ostrovica near Novo Brdo, who was taken by the Ottomans along with some 300 other boys to be trained as Janissaries. All of the higher ranking Serbian officials were executed after the castle fell, with the younger men and boys being taken captive to serve in the Ottoman Army, and some 700 young Serbian women and girls being taken to be wives to Ottoman commanders. When the city fell to the Ottomans, it had an estimated population of about 40,000 people.

In the Ottoman Defter of 1591, the city of Novo Brdo itself was recorded within the Sanjak Vuçitern - this defter included the household heads of the city. The city consisted of several Muslim neighbourhoods (Mahalla/Mëhalla); they were Xhamia Sherif (Sherif Mosque, 26 households), Kasap (11 households), Hamam (21 households), Darbbane (40 households) and Mehmed Çelebi (5 households). There was also 6 Jewish households, including 1 that hailed from Catalonia and 1 that hailed from Castille. Of the Christian neighbourhoods (Mahalla/Mëhalla), the following had inhabitants of mixed Albanian-Slavic/Orthodox anthroponomy: Sokraja (15 households), Pop Simoni (12 households), Çarshi (13) and Himandin (9). Slavic/Orthodox anthroponomy predominated in the following neighbourhoods:Sveti Petra (19 households), Sveti Nika (9 households), Marko Kërsti (26 households), Filip (9 households), Pop Krilovina (10 households), Kallogjer Gligorija (6 households), Kovaç Radosavi (16 households), Shagliçiq (8 households), Shuster (14 households) and Vuka Mrkshiq (8 households). Characteristic Albanian anthroponomy predominated in the following neighbourhoods: Protopop (9 households), Izllatar (9 households), Pop Grobani (Grubani) (5 households), Pop Bozha (4 households) and Kuriçka (13 households).

Modern

By the early 20th century, Novo Brdo's population dwindled, with most inhabitants moving to the more easily accessible area of Gjilan. In 1999, with the entry into Kosovo of KFOR and the United Nations Interim Administration Mission in Kosovo (UNMIK), the area had a small military outpost occupied by US soldiers, as well as a station of International Police and Kosovo Police.

Economy
There are two lead and zinc mines operating on the territory of Novo Brdo: Kišnica and Novo Brdo.

Demographics

According to the last official census done in 2011, the municipality has a population of 6,729 inhabitants. In 2020 estimate, the municipality had 7,121 inhabitants.

Settlements 
Municipality of Novo Brdo consists of 26 settlements with following populations:

 Boljevce / Boleci, 72
 Bostane / Bostani, 487
 Bušince / Bushinca, 128
 Carevce / Careci, 27
 Draganac / Draganca, 17
 Izvor / Izvori, 442
 Jasenovik / Jasenoviku, 210
 Klobukar / Kllobukari, 114
 Koretište / Koretishti, 530
 Kosač / Kosaç, 175
 Gortnje Kusce / Kufca e Epërme, 890
 Labljane / Llabjani, 875
 Gornji Makreš / Makresh i Epërm, 58
 Donji Makreš / Makreshi i Poshtëm, 71
 Manišince / Manishinca, 67
 Mozgovo / Mazgova, uninhabited
 Miganovce / Miganoci, 34
 Novo Brdo / Novobërda, 183
 Paralovo / Parallova, 207
 Pasjak / Pasjaku, 1,176
 Prekovce / Prekoci, 214
 Stanišor / Stanishori, 320
 Straža / Strazha, 191
 Trnićevce / Tërniqeci, 50
 Tirince / Tirinca, 26
 Zebince / Zebinca, 165

Ethnic groups
According to the 1991 census the municipality of Novo Brdo is ethnically mixed, mostly consisting of Kosovo Serbs (60%), Albanians (39%) and other minorities.

The ethnic composition of the municipality of Novo Brdo, including IDPs:

Notable people

 Stefan Milutin (c. 1253–1321), King of Serbia and founder of Novo Brdo Fortress 
 Lazar of Serbia (c. 1329–15 June 1389) medieval Serbian prince, born in the Fortress of Prilepac near Novo Brdo
 Dragana of Serbia (c. 1380s – 1395), Empress consort of Bulgaria, born in the Fortress of Prilepac
 Jelena Balšić (1365/1366 – 1443) medieval Serbian noblewoman, born in the Fortress of Prilepac
 Gjergj Pelini (fl. 1436–died 1463), Albanian Catholic priest and diplomat of Skanderbeg and Venice.
 Dimitrije Kantakouzenos (c. 1435–after 1487), Serbian writer and poet
 Vladislav the Grammarian (fl. 1456–1479) Orthodox monk, writer, historian and theologian

See also
 Municipalities of Kosovo
 Community of Serb Municipalities

Notes and references
Notes

References

External links

 Municipality of Novo Brdo 
 , April 2008.
 Castle in Novo Brdo
 Novo Brdo  youth and rural tourism network, local youth and rural tourism network. Arranges for bed and breakfast-houses and meals.

Medieval Serbian sites in Kosovo
Serb communities in Kosovo
Municipalities of Kosovo